The 2015 Houston Cougars baseball team represented the University of Houston during the 2015 NCAA Division I baseball season. The Cougars played their home games at Cougar Field as a member of the American Athletic Conference. They were led by head coach Todd Whitting, in his fifth season at Houston.

Previous Season
In 2014, the Cougars finished the season 3rd in the American Athletic Conference with a record of 48–16, 14–9 in conference play. They went on to win the 2014 American Athletic Conference baseball tournament. In the 2014 NCAA Division I baseball tournament, the Cougars upset LSU to win the Baton Rouge Regional, before falling to Texas in two games in the Austin Super Regional.

Personnel

Roster

Coaching staff

Season

February
The Cougars opened their season with a three-game series against . The Cougars, ranked 8th in the nation, swept the Golden Gophers over the three game series. Houston outscored Minnesota 14–1 over the first two games of the series, and won the third game on a walk-off to complete the series sweep. The Cougars also had an 11–5 win over  the following Wednesday (after it was pushed back from Tuesday).

On the second weekend of the season, the Cougars hosted 30th ranked Alabama. After winning the first two games of the series, the Crimson Tide salvaged a win in game three, thanks to 14 hits.

The Cougars closed out the month with a four-game series against . Houston was subject to a major upset in the second and fourth games of the series and ended up splitting the four game set with Columbia, the two time defending Ivy League champions. The losses, coupled with the loss to Texas State earlier in the week, caused the Cougars to drop to #12 in two of the major polls.

Schedule

! style="background:#CC0000;color:white;" | Regular Season
|-

|- align="center" bgcolor="#bbffbb"
| February 13 ||  || #8 || Cougar Field • Houston, TX || W 9–1 || Lantrip (1–0) || Meyer (0–1) ||  || 2,132 || 1–0 || –
|- align="center" bgcolor="#bbffbb"
| February 14 || Minnesota || #8 || Cougar Field • Houston, TX || W 5–0 || Lemoine (1–0) || Sawyer (0–1) || Romero (1) || 2,003 || 2–0 || –
|- align="center" bgcolor="#bbffbb"
| February 15 || Minnesota || #8 || Cougar Field • Houston, TX || W 5–4 || Maxwell (1–0) || Thonvold (0–1) ||  || 1,797 || 3–0 || –
|- align="center" bgcolor="#bbffbb"
| February 18 ||  || #6 || Cougar Field • Houston, TX || W 11–5 || Longville (1–0) || Konarik (1–1) || Cobb (1) || 1,442 || 4–0 || –
|- align="center" bgcolor="#bbffbb"
| February 20 || #30 Alabama || #6 || Cougar Field • Houston, TX || W 3–1 || Lantrip (2–0) || Guilbeau (1–1) || Romero (2) || 1,989 || 5–0 || –
|- align="center" bgcolor="#bbffbb"
| February 21 || #30 Alabama || #6 || Cougar Field • Houston, TX || W 14–9 || Maxwell (2–0) || Burrows (0–1) ||  || 2,463 || 6–0 || –
|- align="center" bgcolor="#ffbbbb"
| February 22 || #30 Alabama || #6 || Cougar Field • Houston, TX || L 3–8 || Bramblett (2–0) || Garza (0–1) ||  || 1,883 || 6–1 || –
|- align="center" bgcolor="#ffbbbb"
| February 25 || at  || #6 || Bobcat Ballpark • San Marcos, TX || L 6–7 || Whitter (1–0) || Longville (1–1) ||  || 1,316 || 6–2 || –
|- align="center" bgcolor="#bbffbb"
| February 27 ||  || #6 || Cougar Field • Houston, TX || W 3–0 || Lantrip (3–0) || Thanopoulos (0–1) || Romero (3) || 1,279 || 7–2 || –
|- align="center" bgcolor="#ffbbbb"
| February 28 || Columbia || #6 || Cougar Field • Houston, TX || L 4–5 (13) || Barr (1–0) || Robinson (0–1) || Gannaway (1) || 1,772 || 7–3 || –
|- align="center" bgcolor="#bbffbb"
| February 28 || Columbia || #6 || Cougar Field • Houston, TX || W 8–7 || Weigel (1–0) || Ratner (0–1) ||  || 1,772 || 8–3 || –
|-

|- align="center" bgcolor="#ffbbbb"
| March 1 || Columbia || #6 || Cougar Field • Houston, TX || L 7–12 || Wiest (1–0) || Romero (0–1) || Marks (1) || 1,216 || 8–4 || –
|- align="center" bgcolor="#ffbbbb"
| March 3 ||  || #12 || Cougar Field • Houston, TX || L 1–2 || Jones (1–1) || Longville (1–2) || Garza (1) || 1,231 || 8–5 || –
|- align="center" bgcolor="#ffbbbb"
| March 6 || vs. #3 LSU || #12 || Minute Maid Park • Houston, TX || L 2–4 || Poche' (4–0) || Lantrip (3–1) || Stallings (6) || 10,651 || 8–6 || –
|- align="center" bgcolor="#ffbbbb"
| March 7 || vs. #11  || #12 || Minute Maid Park • Houston, TX || L 0–6 || Long (3–0) || Lemoine (1–1) ||  || 16,276 || 8–7 || –
|- align="center" bgcolor="#bbffbb"
| March 8 || vs.  || #12 || Minute Maid Park • Houston, TX || W 8–6 || Romero (1–1) || Torres-Costa (0–3) ||  || 10,866 || 9–7 || –
|- align="center" bgcolor="#bbffbb"
| March 10 || at  ||  || Don Sanders Stadium • Huntsville, TX || W 17–7 || Dowdy (1–0) || Bisacca (1–1) ||  || 803 || 10–7 || –
|- align="center" bgcolor="#bbffbb"
| March 13 || Buffalo ||  || Cougar Field • Houston, TX || W 9–1 || Lantrip (4–1) || Hartz (0–3) ||  || 1,355 || 11–7 || –
|- align="center" bgcolor="#bbffbb"
| March 14 || Buffalo ||  || Cougar Field • Houston, TX || W 9–3 || Weigel (2–0) || Magovney (1–3) ||  || 1,462 || 12–7 || –
|- align="center" bgcolor="#bbffbb"
| March 15 || Buffalo ||  || Cougar Field • Houston, TX || W 5–0 || Cobb (1–0) || McGee (1–1) ||  || 1,308 || 13–7 || –
|- align="center" bgcolor="#bbffbb"
| March 17 || #15  ||  || Cougar Field • Houston, TX || W 8–3 || Romero (2–1) || Stephens (1–1) || Garza (1) || 2,789 || 14–7 || –
|- align="center" bgcolor="#bbffbb"
| March 20 || at  ||  || Lobo Field • Albuquerque, NM || W 6–5 || Lantrip (5–1) || Boardman (4–1) || Garza (2) || 769 || 15–7 || –
|- align="center" bgcolor="#bbffbb"
| March 21 || at New Mexico ||  || Lobo Field • Albuquerque, NM || W 6–5 || Dowdy (2–0) || Stevens (1–1) || Garza (3) || 982 || 16–7 || –
|- align="center" bgcolor="#bbffbb"
| March 22 || at New Mexico ||  || Lobo Field • Albuquerque, NM || W 8–7 || Romero (3–1) || Estrella (0–1) ||  || 463 || 17–7 || –
|- align="center" bgcolor="#bbffbb"
| March 24 || Lamar || #16 || Cougar Field • Houston, TX || W 6–5 (10) || Moore (1–0) || Oquendo (0–1) ||  || 1,502 || 18–7 || –
|- align="center" bgcolor="#ffbbbb"
| March 27 || at #8 UCF || #16 || Jay Bergman Field • Orlando, FL || L 2–9 || Finfrock (6–0) || Lantrip (5–1) ||  || 1,397 || 18–8 || 0–1
|- align="center" bgcolor="#bbffbb"
| March 28 || at #8 UCF || #16 || Jay Bergman Field • Orlando, FL || W 7–5 || Dowdy (3–0) || Howell (4–2) || Romero (4) || 1,555 || 19–8 || 1–1
|- align="center" bgcolor="#ffbbbb"
| March 29 || at #8 UCF || #16 || Jay Bergman Field • Orlando, FL || L 3–4 || Rodgers (4–0) || Romero (3–2) ||  || 1,281 || 19–9 || 1–2
|- align="center" bgcolor="#bbffbb"
| March 31 || at Baylor || #14 || Baylor Ballpark • Waco, TX || W 11–0 || Longville (2–2) || Kay (3–2) ||  || 2,104 || 20–9 || –
|-

|- align="center" bgcolor="#bbffbb"
| April 2 || at Memphis || #14 || FedExPark • Memphis, TN || W 3–2 || Lantrip (6–2) || Wallingford (3–3) ||  || 712 || 21–9 || 2–2
|- align="center" bgcolor="#ffbbbb"
| April 3 || at Memphis || #14 || FedExPark • Memphis, TN || L 6–14 || Toscano (3–1) || Dowdy (3–1) ||  || 912 || 21–10 || 2–3
|- align="center" bgcolor="#ffbbbb"
| April 4 || at Memphis || #14 || FedExPark • Memphis, TN || L 2–6 || Alexander (4–0) || Romero (3–2) || Blackwood (10) || 829 || 21–11 || 2–4
|- align="center" bgcolor="#ffbbbb"
| April 7 || at Louisiana–Lafayette || #25 || M. L. Tigue Moore Field • Lafayette, LA || L 5–6 || Marks (2–0) || Garza (0–2) ||  || 3,885 || 21–12 || –
|- align="center" bgcolor=""
| April 10 || Tulane || #25 || Cougar Field • Houston, TX ||  ||  ||  ||  ||  ||  ||
|- align="center" bgcolor=""
| April 11 || Tulane || #25 || Cougar Field • Houston, TX ||  ||  ||  ||  ||  ||  ||
|- align="center" bgcolor=""
| April 12 || Tulane || #25 || Cougar Field • Houston, TX ||  ||  ||  ||  ||  ||  ||
|- align="center" bgcolor=""
| April 14 || at Rice ||  || Reckling Park • Houston, TX ||  ||  ||  ||  ||  ||  ||
|- align="center" bgcolor=""
| April 17 || Cincinnati ||  || Cougar Field • Houston, TX ||  ||  ||  ||  ||  ||  ||
|- align="center" bgcolor=""
| April 18 || Cincinnati ||  || Cougar Field • Houston, TX ||  ||  ||  ||  ||  ||  ||
|- align="center" bgcolor=""
| April 19 || Cincinnati ||  || Cougar Field • Houston, TX ||  ||  ||  ||  ||  ||  ||
|- align="center" bgcolor=""
| April 21 || at  ||  || Cowboy Diamond • Lake Charles, LA ||  ||  ||  ||  ||  ||  ||
|- align="center" bgcolor=""
| April 24 || at South Florida ||  || USF Baseball Stadium • Tampa, FL ||  ||  ||  ||  ||  ||  ||
|- align="center" bgcolor=""
| April 25 || at South Florida ||  || USF Baseball Stadium • Tampa, FL ||  ||  ||  ||  ||  ||  ||
|- align="center" bgcolor=""
| April 26 || at South Florida ||  || USF Baseball Stadium • Tampa, FL ||  ||  ||  ||  ||  ||  ||
|- align="center" bgcolor=""
| April 28 || Sam Houston State ||  || Cougar Field • Houston, TX ||  ||  ||  ||  ||  ||  ||
|-

|- align="center" bgcolor=""
| May 1 || at Tulane ||  || Greer Field • New Orleans, LA ||  ||  ||  ||  ||  ||  ||
|- align="center" bgcolor=""
| May 2 || at Tulane ||  || Greer Field • New Orleans, LA ||  ||  ||  ||  ||  ||  ||
|- align="center" bgcolor=""
| May 3 || at Tulane ||  || Greer Field • New Orleans, LA ||  ||  ||  ||  ||  ||  ||
|- align="center" bgcolor=""
| May 5 || McNeese State ||  || Cougar Field • Houston, TX ||  ||  ||  ||  ||  ||  ||
|- align="center" bgcolor=""
| May 8 || East Carolina ||  || Cougar Field • Houston, TX ||  ||  ||  ||  ||  ||  ||
|- align="center" bgcolor=""
| May 9 || East Carolina ||  || Cougar Field • Houston, TX ||  ||  ||  ||  ||  ||  ||
|- align="center" bgcolor=""
| May 10 || East Carolina ||  || Cougar Field • Houston, TX ||  ||  ||  ||  ||  ||  ||
|- align="center" bgcolor=""
| May 12 || vs. Rice ||  || Constellation Field • Sugar Land, TX ||  ||  ||  ||  ||  ||  ||
|- align="center" bgcolor=""
| May 14 || Connecticut ||  || Cougar Field • Houston, TX ||  ||  ||  ||  ||  ||  ||
|- align="center" bgcolor=""
| May 15 || Connecticut ||  || Cougar Field • Houston, TX ||  ||  ||  ||  ||  ||  ||
|- align="center" bgcolor=""
| May 16 || Connecticut ||  || Cougar Field • Houston, TX ||  ||  ||  ||  ||  ||  ||
|-

|-
! style="background:#CC0000;color:white;" | Post-Season
|-

|- align="center" bgcolor=""
| May 19 ||  ||  || Bright House Field • Clearwater, FL ||  ||  ||  ||  ||  ||  ||
|- align="center" bgcolor=""
| May 19 ||  ||  || Bright House Field • Clearwater, FL ||  ||  ||  ||  ||  ||  ||
|-

|-
| style="font-size:88%"| All rankings from Collegiate Baseball.

Rankings

Awards and honors
Jake Lemoine
 Louisville Slugger Pre-season Third team All-American
 Perfect Game USA Pre-season Second team All-American
 Pre-season All-AAC
 Baseball America Pre-season Second team All-American

Aaron Garza
 Pre-season All-AAC

Andrew Lantrip
 Pre-season All-AAC

Jared Robinson
 Pre-season All-AAC

Connor Hollis
 Pre-season All-AAC

Kyle Survance
 Pre-season All-AAC

References

Houston Cougars
Houston Cougars baseball seasons
Houston
Houston Cougars baseball